EHEC may mean:

 Enterohemorrhagic Escherichia coli, strain of bacteria
 Ethyl hydroxyethyl cellulose, a chemical compound